The Sphinx Senior Society is one of the oldest senior honor societies at the University of Pennsylvania in Philadelphia, Pennsylvania. The organization, founded in 1900, is self-perpetuating and consists of a maximum of 30 members selected annually. Its members are a diverse and varied group, coming from all areas of achievement, community, activities, and backgrounds. Each member is chosen because of the singular achievements from his or her committed leadership to the university, community and public.

The Sphinx Senior Society, Inc. is a recognized nonprofit organization with 501(c)(3) status.

Membership 
The undergraduate society consists of 30 members, with 23 being inducted each spring and an additional 7 being inducted each fall.  Members, officially called "Sphinges," represent student leaders that have served the university community in some form or manner and are selected based on their character, involvement, leadership, and vision. This membership perpetuates through a "tapping" process every spring, during which current members personally nominate deserving juniors to attend a smoker. This informal smoker provides an opportunity for the taps to pick up an application as well as for the current members to meet and screen nominees before starting the selection process. This process is repeated each fall to tap, select, and induct an additional 7 seniors as members of the given class.

Board of Governors 
The Sphinx Senior Society Board of Governors guides, plans and coordinates all activities of the Society, especially expanding alumni outreach and supporting the undergraduate membership. The 17-member Board consists of a President, Vice-President, Treasurer, Secretary, President-Emeritus, and Chief, Pharisee, or Scribe Emeritus from the most recent graduating Sphinx class, as well as eight alumni Members-at-Large elected by the entire Sphinx alumni membership. These alumni members cover as wide a range of Penn alumni classes as possible. The three officers from the current class of the undergraduate membership also serve on the Board in an ex officio capacity.

2018-19 Board of Governors

Gregory Suss, Esq., PhD., C’75, President

Elizabeth Katz Miller, W’87, Vice President

Louis Hornick III, C’02, Treasurer

Anita Saggurti, C’12, Secretary

Stephen H. Klitzman, Esq., C’66, President-Emeritus

Dhruv Agarwal, E’18, Chief-Emeritus

Eric Apple

Joshua Chilcote

Luis Ernesto Del Valle

John Fiorillo

Urja Mittal

Jeremy Pincus

Kiera Reilly

David Scollan

Jay Shah, Undergraduate Chief

Selected notable members 
Mitchell J. Blutt - Executive Partner, J.P. Morgan Chase and CEO of Consonance Capital - 1978
Bill Carr - Winner of two gold medals at the 1932 Los Angeles Olympics - 1933
Richard Clarke - Author, National Counterterrorism Center Director under Presidents Bill Clinton and George W. Bush - 1972
William T. Coleman, Jr. - United States Secretary of Transportation, 1975–77, and recipient of the Presidential Medal of Freedom - 1995
Jeffrey Goldberg - Award winning journalist. Currently Editor-in-Chief of The Atlantic magazine - 1987
Jon Huntsman, Sr. - Billionaire, founder of the Huntsman Corporation - 1959
John B. Kelly Jr. - accomplished oarsman, four-time Olympian, and Olympic medal winner and President of the United States Olympic Committee; brother of actress Grace Kelly; Kelly Drive in Philadelphia is named for him - 1950
 John Legend/John Stephens - American  soul singer, songwriter, and pianist - 2000
Donald Lippincott - Winner of a silver and a bronze medal at the 1912 Stockholm Olympics - 1915
Marc Turtletaub - Film producer and director, and, former CEO of  The Money Store - 1967
John Edgar Wideman - American writer, Rhodes Scholar, MacArthur Genius Grant recipient and two-time winner of the International PEN/Faulkner Award; currently professor at Brown University - 1963

Notes

References

1900 establishments in Pennsylvania
Honor societies
University of Pennsylvania
Student societies in the United States
Student organizations established in 1900
Collegiate secret societies
Secret societies in the United States